Black Market Babies is a 1945 American crime drama film directed by William Beaudine and released by Monogram Pictures. The film has been released on dvd.

Plot
A small-time hood teams up with an alcoholic obstetrician to set up a private maternity ward, where the expectant mothers' expenses are paid by the "donations" of "adoptive" parents. The racket goes wrong when one of the pre-sold children is stillborn, which means the hood has to come up with a replacement baby.

Cast

Production
The Motion Picture Producers and Distributors of America, which enforced the Hays Code, at the time did not allow films to show that pregnancy, if shown at all, resulted in any visual changes to a woman's body. After reviewing the script for Black Market Babies, it cautioned that actresses were not to use any padding to simulate pregnancy.

References

External links

1945 films
Films directed by William Beaudine
Monogram Pictures films
1945 crime drama films
American crime drama films
American black-and-white films
1940s English-language films
1940s American films